Forme is a settlement in the Municipality of Škofja Loka in the Upper Carniola region of Slovenia.

Name
Forme was attested in historical sources as Farmarch in 1443, Farmach between 1485 and 1490, and Formach in 1489.

References

External links 

Forme at Geopedia

Populated places in the Municipality of Škofja Loka